Abrilumab (INN; development code AMG 181) is a monoclonal antibody designed for the treatment of inflammatory bowel disease, ulcerative colitis, and Crohn's disease.

This drug was developed by MedImmune.

References 

Monoclonal antibodies
Experimental drugs
AstraZeneca brands